is a former Japanese football player.

Club statistics

References

External links

1979 births
Living people
Osaka University of Commerce alumni
Association football people from Hyōgo Prefecture
Japanese footballers
J2 League players
Japan Football League players
Sagawa Shiga FC players
FC Gifu players
Association football midfielders